Matilda Brown (born 9 June 1987) is an Australian actress, writer and director.

Career

Matilda Brown is best known for her work in the short film series, Lessons From The Grave where she stars opposite her father Bryan Brown. Her mother is actress Rachel Ward. She has an elder sister Rosie and a younger brother Joe, who is also working as an actor.

Her short film, How God Works, was a finalist in the 2010 Tropfest.

Other television credits include guest spots on My Place, Rake and Offspring 

Her partner is former My Kitchen Rules contestant Scott Gooding. Together they have a son, Zan Neathway Gooding . The two married on Saturday 16 November 2019. In February 2021, the two had a daughter, Anouk.

Selected filmography
 Twisted Tales (1996) TV series
 Martha's New Coat (2003)
 The Road Ahead (2007) Short film
 Underbelly: The Golden Mile (2010) TV series
 How God Works (2010) Short film (actress, director, writer)
 Offspring (2010) TV series
 Rake (2010–2012) TV series
 My Place (2011) TV series
 Cocks (2011) Short film (actress, director, writer)
 Am I Okay (2012) Short film (actress, director)
 Lessons from the Grave (2013) TV miniseries (actress, director, writer)
 The iMom (2014) Short film
 Let's Talk About (2015) streaming TV series (actress, director, writer)
 Palm Beach (2019) (actress)

Awards and nominations

References

External links 
 
 

20th-century Australian actresses
21st-century Australian actresses
Australian film actresses
Australian television actresses
Australian writers
1987 births
Living people
Place of birth missing (living people)
Date of birth missing (living people)